Cyclamen colchicum is a perennial growing from a tuber, native to densely shaded areas among rocks or tree roots in woodland on limestone at  elevation in the autonomous republic of Adjara in Georgia, about  from the range of the closely related species Cyclamen purpurascens. Unlike C. purpurascens, leaves are very thick and leathery with finely toothed edges.

External links

Cyclamen Society
Cyclamen: a guide for gardeners, horticulturists, and botanists by C. Grey-Wilson — Google Books (picture of leaf shape)
Pacific Bulb Society
Mark Griffiths Inspiring Plants.org (Cyclamen colchicum)
IPNI Listing
Kew Plant List

colchicum